"It's Alright" is the debut single by Kaycee Grogan. It was the only single released from her debut album, first appearing on Billboard lists on December 14, 1996. The single peaked at number sixty-one on the Billboard Hot 100.

Chart positions

References

1996 songs
1996 debut singles
Columbia Records singles
Contemporary R&B songs